Lightfoot is a surname.  It was a nickname for a swift runner. Notable people with the surname include:

 Albert Lightfoot (born 1936), English cricketer
 Amanda Lightfoot (born 1987), English biathlete
 Chris Lightfoot (1978–2007), English scientist and political activist
 Chris Lightfoot (footballer) (born 1970), former English footballer
 Claude Lightfoot (1910–1986), African-American activist
 David Lightfoot, Australian film producer
 Deborah Dillon Lightfoot (1956–2007), American wheelchair athlete
 Edwin N. Lightfoot (1925–2017), American chemical engineer
 Genevievette Walker-Lightfoot, American former U.S. Securities and Exchange Commission attorney
 Gordon Lightfoot (born 1938), Canadian singer-songwriter
 Hannah Lightfoot (1730–1759), sometimes erroneously named wife of George III of the United Kingdom
 Jim Lightfoot (speedway rider) (born 1933), English former speedway rider
 Jim Ross Lightfoot (born 1938), former U.S. Representative from Iowa
 John Lightfoot (1602–1675), English churchman and rabbinical scholar
 John Lightfoot (biologist) (1735–1788), English naturalist
 John Prideaux Lightfoot (1803-1887), English clergyman
 Joseph Barber Lightfoot (1828–1889), English theologian, translator of the Apostolic Fathers, and Bishop of Durham
 Lori Lightfoot (born 1962), American politician currently serving as Mayor of Chicago
 Maxwell Gordon Lightfoot (1886–1911), English painter
 Orlando Lightfoot (born 1974), former American professional basketball player
 Robert Lightfoot (disambiguation), several people
 Rona Lightfoot (born 1936), Scottish bagpipe player 
 Ross Lightfoot (born 1936), Liberal member of the Australian Senate
 Teddy Lightfoot (1889–1919), English footballer
 William Lightfoot (born 1950), member of the Council of the District of Columbia

Fictional characters 
 Miss Lightfoot, a recurring character in the Disney Channel TV show The Ghost and Molly McGee

Given name 
The following individuals have the given name of Lightfoot:
Samuel Lightfoot Flournoy (politician) (1846–1904), European American politician
Samuel Lightfoot Flournoy (lawyer) (1886–1961), European American lawyer
William Lightfoot Price (1861-1916), European American Architect

English-language surnames
Surnames from nicknames